Milton Peter Nielsen (born March 15, 1938 in Burley, Idaho) was  a Republican Idaho State Representative from 2002-2012 representing District 22 in the B seat. In 2012- 2016 he served in the Idaho House of Representatives representing District 23 in the B seat.

Elections

Views
On February 25, 2016, Nielsen claimed that women who are raped or victims of incest are less likely to become pregnant, due to "trauma". "Being a father of five girls, I've explored this a lot."

References

External links
Pete Nielsen at the Idaho Legislature
 

1938 births
Living people
Brigham Young University alumni
Republican Party members of the Idaho House of Representatives
People from Burley, Idaho
Utah State University alumni
American Latter Day Saints
21st-century American politicians
People from Mountain Home, Idaho